Rio Branco or Río Branco (Portuguese for "White River") may refer to:

People
José Paranhos, Viscount of Rio Branco (1819–1880), Brazilian statesman, journalist, diplomat, politician and educator
José Paranhos, Baron of Rio Branco (1845–1912), Brazilian diplomat, lawyer, professor, politician and historian

Geography
Rio Branco, Acre, capital city of the Brazilian state of Acre
Rio Branco, Mato Grosso, Brazil
Rio Branco, Rio Grande do Sul, a neighbourhood in Porto Alegre, Brazil
Río Branco, Uruguay, a city in the department of Cerro Largo, Uruguay
Rio Branco do Ivaí, a municipality in Paraná, Brazil
Rio Branco do Sul, a municipality in Paraná, Brazil
Avenida Rio Branco, a major street in central Rio de Janeiro
Branco River, a tributary of the Rio Negro, known in Brazil as Rio Branco
Mount Rio Branco, Graham Land, Antarctica
Visconde do Rio Branco, a city located in the Brazilian state of Minas Gerais
The former name of the Brazilian territory, and later state, of Roraima

Sports
Clube Esportivo Rio Branco, a Brazilian football team from Campos dos Goytacazes, Rio de Janeiro
Rio Branco Atlético Clube, a Brazilian football team from Cariacica, Espírito Santo
Rio Branco de Andradas Futebol Clube, a Brazilian football team from Andradas, Minas Gerais
Rio Branco Esporte Clube, a Brazilian football team from Americana, São Paulo
Rio Branco Football Club, a Brazilian football team from Rio Branco, Acre
Rio Branco Futebol Clube, a Brazilian football team from Venda Nova do Imigrante, Espírito Santo
Rio Branco Sport Club, a Brazilian football club from Paranaguá, Paraná
Copa Río Branco, a national football team's competition between Brazil and Uruguay

Other uses
Instituto Rio Branco, Brazil's diplomatic academy
Order of Rio Branco (Ordem de Rio Branco), an honorific order of Brazil

See also

Branco River (disambiguation)